Beatty is an unincorporated community and census-designated place (CDP) in Klamath County, Oregon, United States.

Beatty was named for J. L. Beatty, a missionary who lived nearby when the area was in the Klamath Indian Reservation. The post office in Beatty, ZIP code 97621, was established in 1913. Toby "Winema" Riddle is buried near Beatty.

Beatty had a station on the Oregon, California and Eastern Railway, which by 1927 reached from Klamath Falls to Bly. A 1941 timetable lists Beatty as the 13th stop east of Klamath Falls between Sprague River and Sycan. After 1990, the rail line passing near Beatty became part of a rail trail, the OC&E Woods Line State Trail, managed by the Oregon Parks and Recreation Department.

Demographics

Climate
This region experiences warm (but not hot) and dry summers, with no average monthly temperatures above .  According to the Köppen Climate Classification system, Beatty has a warm-summer Mediterranean climate, abbreviated "Csb" on climate maps.

References

Unincorporated communities in Klamath County, Oregon
1913 establishments in Oregon
Unincorporated communities in Oregon
Census-designated places in Klamath County, Oregon
Census-designated places in Oregon